Diosdado Simón Villares (Torremenga, October 15, 1954-Cáceres, April 28, 2002) was a Spanish researcher, biologist, botanist, tree surgeon and environmental teacher.

He studied Biology in UCM, and investigated Extremaduran vegetation. He was the manager of Cáceres' parks and gardens and a member of ADENEX. This association paid him a tribute in 2003 when they gave his name to their price ADENEX- Diosdado Simón.

He died of lung cancer in 2002 when he was preparing the exhibition of orchids Por huevos (by eggs, Orchis means testis in Latin). He was married to the lawyer Dolores Neria and they had two children.

Cáceres City Council gave his name to a garden he designed,  Jardín Diosdado Simón, which is located between the museums, Museo de Pedrilla and Museo de Guayasamín, which hosted his last exhibition Por huevos.

Bibliography
Cáceres verde : el paseo de Cánovas, Diosdado Simón Villares, Jose María Corrales Vázquez 
Badajoz : Institución Cultural El Brocense, 2001. 
Árboles Notables de Extremadura, Diosdado Simón Villares, ADENEX, 1999

1954 births
2002 deaths
People from the Province of Cáceres
Deaths from lung cancer in Spain
Spanish biologists
20th-century Spanish botanists
20th-century biologists